The 1926 Swedish Ice Hockey Championship was the fifth season of the Swedish Ice Hockey Championship, the national championship of Sweden. Djurgardens IF won the championship.

Tournament

First round 
5 February
 Södertälje SK 7–2 AIK

Second round
8 February
 Djurgårdens IF 5–4 IK Göta 
 Södertälje SK 4–3 Hammarby IF
 Nacka SK 3–1 IFK Stockholm

Finals bracket

External links
 Season on hockeyarchives.info

Champ
Swedish Ice Hockey Championship seasons